Komarnica is a small settlement in the Slovene Hills in the Municipality of Cerkvenjak in northeastern Slovenia. The area is part of the traditional region of Styria. It is now included in the Drava Statistical Region.

References

External links
Komarnica on Geopedia

Populated places in the Municipality of Cerkvenjak